Union of European Leagues of Basketball (ULEB) is a sports organization within basketball created for growth of professional basketball in Europe. Its members are the professional basketball leagues organisations of 11 countries: Belgium, France, Germany, Greece, Israel, Italy, Lithuania, the Netherlands, Poland, Russia, and Spain.

History 
The professional basketball organizing bodies of Italy, France and Spain established the ULEB on June 25, 1991 in Rome, Italy. In November 1992, a joint All-Star weekend was held in Madrid, Spain, featuring the most outstanding players from the Spanish and Italian Leagues. The experience was repeated one year later in Rome before a crowd of 10.500 fans. In 1994, the French League joined the event and the All Star weekend moved to Valencia, Spain, with Italian, Spanish and French stars competing and showing their skills.

The Greek League was the first to join the three founders in 1996. The ULEB has had three Presidents since its inception: Gianluigi Porelli (since September 1991 until March 1998), Eduardo Portela, (since March 18, 1998 until October 6, 2016) and Tomas Van Den Spiegel, elected October 6, 2016. In December 1999, the Union welcomed the British, Belgian and Swiss Leagues.

A key date in ULEB and European basketball history was Friday June 9, 2000. That day, the most important clubs in Europe and the ULEB leagues, met in Sitges, and decided to create and manage a new competition, the EuroLeague. Until that moment, it had been FIBA that ran the men's top basketball clubs competition in Europe. The first game of the new EuroLeague, Real Madrid vs. Olympiacos, was played October 16, 2000 in Madrid.

One year later, in October 2001, the ULEB was expanded with the leagues of Germany, Netherlands and Poland. In October 2002, the ULEB Cup, the second-tier level European club competition, was born. Its first game was played in Istanbul, on October 15, 2002, between Darüşşafaka and Novo Mesto.

In June 2003, the league of Lithuania joined, and one year later, in July 2005 ,the union was expanded with the league of Israel. The most recent addition to the ULEB family is the Russian VTB United League, which was granted admission in July 2014, replacing its predecessor, the PBL (which had been admitted in May 2011). So, the ULEB currently represents a total number of 10 professional basketball leagues from across Europe. Other leagues such as Portugal, Adriatic, Austria, Switzerland and the Czech Republic, have been also members of the ULEB in the past, but all of them left the Union for different reasons. The Portuguese and Swiss leagues have ceased memberships, the Adriatic lost recognition from FIBA Europe, and the Austrian, British and Czech leagues voluntarily renounced their membership.

ULEB is currently a shareholder of Euroleague Commercial Assets (ECA) through Euroleague Basketball SL, and is also a shareholder of Basketball Champions League SA. As written above, former Belgian player Tomas Van Den Spiegel is the current President of the ULEB, and Greek League President Vangelis Galatsopoulos is the current Vice President. The current Executive Committee of the Union is completed by the leagues of Belgium, France, Germany and Spain.

Members 
Members of ULEB in 2017:

Current

Former 
Former ULEB members:

  Portugal (1996–2008, ceased membership)
  Russia (2011–2013, replaced by VTB United League)
  Adriatic (2002–2015, lost recognition from FIBA Europe)
  Austria (2002–2015, withdrew)
  Switzerland (1999–2016, ceased membership)
  Czech Republic (2004–2016, withdrew)
  United Kingdom (1999–2017, withdrew)

Presidents
 Gianluigi Porelli 1991-1998
 Eduardo Portela 1998-2016
 Thomas Van Den Spiegel 2016-

See also 
 ULEB All-Star Games 
 European professional club basketball system
 Historical European national basketball league rankings
 European Professional Football Leagues

References

External links 
 ULEB official website

Sports organizations established in 1991
 
1991 establishments in Europe